Browne State Forest is a  state forest in Essex County, Virginia.

Browne State Forest is owned and maintained by the Virginia Department of Forestry. The forest is open to the public for various recreational opportunities, including hunting, hiking, and mountain biking. Motorized vehicles are prohibited. Some uses may require visitors to possess a valid State Forest Use Permit.

See also
 List of Virginia state forests

References

External links
Browne State Forest

Virginia state forests
Protected areas of Essex County, Virginia
2005 establishments in Virginia
Protected areas established in 2005